Gokarna Mahadev (The Gods of Gokarna) or Gokarneshwor Mahadev Temple (The Lord of Gokarna) is an important Nepali temple, situated near the village of Gokarna, several kilometers northeast of Bodhnath in the Kathmandu Valley. Within the temple's sanctum lies an important lingam of the Hindu god Shiva, but its fame relies mainly on the collection of statues and carvings around the temple.

Gallery

References 

 Around Kathmandu Valley, Nepal Map Publisher Pvt. Ltd., Kathmandu 2009.
 John Sanday: Collins illustrated guide to the Kathmandu valley. The Guidebook Company, Landon 1989, .
 Baedeker Allianz Reiseführer Nepal. 2. Auflage. Verlag Karl Baedeker, Ostfildern 1999, .
 Rainer Krack: Nepal - Kathmandu Valley. Reise Know-How Verlag Rump, Bielefeld 2009, .
 Joseph Bindloss, Trent Holden, Bradley Mayhew: Nepal. 8th Edition. Lonely Planet Publications, Melbourne 2009, .

Notes

Buildings and structures in Kathmandu District
Hindu temples in Kathmandu District